The men's discus throw at the 2011 IPC Athletics World Championships was held at the QEII Stadium from 22 to 28 January.

In the Men's discus throw F42, held on January 27, the Gold was originally won by Fanie Lombaard of South Africa. However, he tested positive for Probenecid in a urine sample provided on 27 January 2011. The prohibited substance had been prescribed to him because of a medical problem, but he did not have a Therapeutic Use Exemption (TUE). The International Paralympic Committee (IPC) suspended him for a year (from January 27), and fined him 1,500 euros. The IPC redistributed the medals.

Medalists

F11
The Men's discus throw, F11 was held on January 22

F11 = visual impairment: from no light perception in either eye, to light perception but with the inability to recognise the shape of a hand at any distance or in any direction.

Results

Final

F12
The Men's discus throw, F12 was held on January 28

F12 = visual impairment: may recognise the shape of a hand, have a visual acuity of 2/60 and/or visual field of less than 5 degrees.

Results

Final

Key:   SB = Season Best

F32/33/34
The Men's discus throw, F32/33/34 was held on January 24 and the medal ceremony on January 25

F32/33/34 
F32 = poor functional strength in arms, legs and trunk, able to propel a wheelchair. Compete in a wheelchair, may throw a discus from a throwing frame. 
F33 = some degree of trunk movement when pushing a wheelchair, forward trunk movement limited during forceful pushing. Throwing movements mainly from the arm. Compete in a wheelchair or from a throwing frame. 
F34 = demonstrates good functional strength, minimal limitation or control problems in arms or trunk. Compete in a wheelchair or from a throwing frame.

Results

Final

Key:   WR = World Record, CR = Championship Record, AR = Area Record, SB = Season Best, PB = Personal Best, NM = No Mark

F35/36
The Men's discus throw, F35/36 was held on January 28

F35/36 
F35 = good static balance, problems in dynamic balance. A shift of centre of gravity may lead to loss of balance, may have sufficient lower extremity function to execute a run up when throwing. 
F36 = able to walk without assistance or assistive devices, more control problems with upper than lower limbs. All four limbs are involved, dynamic is often better than static balance. Hand control, grasp and release affected when throwing.

Results

Final

Key:   CR = Championship Record, AR = Area Record, SB = Season Best, NM = No Mark

F37/38
The Men's discus throw, F37/38 was held on January 23 with the medal ceremony on January 24

F37/38 
F37 = spasticity in an arm and leg on the same side, good functional ability on the non impaired side, better development, good arm and hand control and follow through. 
F38 = must meet the minimum disability criteria for athletes with cerebral palsy, head injury or stroke. A limitation in function that impacts on sports performance.

Results

Final

Key:   WR = World Record, CR = Championship Record, SB = Season Best, NM = No Mark

F40
The Men's discus throw, F40 was held on January 24

F40 =  dwarfism.

Results

Final

Key:   WR = World Record, SB = Season Best, AR = Area Record

F42
The Men's discus throw, F42 was held on January 27. The Gold was originally won by Fanie Lombaard of South Africa. However, he tested positive for Probenecid in a urine sample provided on 27 January 2011. The prohibited substance had been prescribed to him because of a medical problem, but he did not have a Therapeutic Use Exemption (TUE). The International Paralympic Committee (IPC) suspended him for a year (from January 27), and fined him 1,500 euros.

The IPC upgraded Keersmaeker, Davies and Fylachtos to gold, silver and bronze respectively.

F42 =  single above knee amputation or equivalent impairments.

Results

Final

Key:   SB = Season Best, DNS = Did not Start

F44
The Men's discus throw, F44 was held on January 26

F44 =  single below knee amputation or equivalent impairments.

Results

Final

Key:   WR = World Record, SB = Season Best

F46
The Men's discus throw, F46 was held on January 25

F46 =  single above or below elbow amputation, or equivalent impairments.

Results

Final

Key:   CR = Championship Record, SB = Season Best, AR = Area Record

F51/52/53
The Men's discus throw, F51/52/53 was held on January 27

F51/52/53 
F51 = a weakness in shoulder function, the ability to bend but not straighten the elbow joint, no trunk or leg function, no movement in the fingers, can bend the wrists backwards but not forwards. 
F52 = good shoulder, elbow and wrist function, poor to normal finger flexion and extension, no trunk or leg function.
F53 = normal upper limb function, no abdominal, leg or lower spinal function.

Results

Final

Key:   WR = World Record, AR = Area Record, SB = Season Best

F54/55/56
The Men's discus throw, F54/55/56 was held on January 28

F54/55/56 
F54 = normal upper limb function, no abdominal or lower spinal function. 
F55 = normal upper limb function, may have partial to almost normal trunk function, no leg function. 
F56 = normal upper limb and trunk function, some leg function, may have high bilateral above knee amputation.

Results

Final

Key:   WR = World Record, AR = Area Record

F57/58
The Men's discus throw, F57/58 was held on January 26

F57/58 
F57 = normal upper limb and trunk function, may have bilateral above knee amputations. 
F58 = normal upper limb and trunk function, bilateral below knee amputation or single above knee amputation.

Results

Final

Key:   WR = World Record, SB = Season Best

See also
2011 IPC Athletics World Championships – Men's pentathlon
List of IPC world records in athletics

References
General
Schedule and results, Official site of the 2011 IPC Athletics World Championships
IPC Athletics Classification Explained, Scottish Disability Sport
Specific

Discus throw
Discus throw at the World Para Athletics Championships